Arab Germans, also referred to as German Arabs or Arabic Germans, are ethnic Arabs living in Germany. They form the second-largest predominantly Muslim immigrant group in Germany after the large Turkish German community.

There is an estimated number of 400,000 to 500,000 people of Arab origin residing in Germany in 2013. In the following years, the numbers doubled as they are an estimated 1,000,000+ people. As of 2020, the total number of people from Arab League countries reached 1,401,950. Most Arabs moved to Germany in the 1970s, partly as Gastarbeiter from Morocco, the Turkish Province of Mardin (see: Arabs in Turkey) and Tunisia. Later many came from Kuwait, Lebanon, and recently many came from Syria and Iraq. The majority of Arabs are refugees of the conflicts in the Middle East.

The first notable Arab-German was Emily Ruete, originally Salama bint Said, a Princess of Zanzibar who became pregnant by a German man who was her neighbor. Fearing retaliation, she eloped with him to Germany, converted to Christianity, and married him.  She later published her autobiography, “Memoirs of an Arabian Princess”.

Geographical distribution
The largest concentration of Arab people in Germany, can be found in Berlin, where they make up 2%–3% (100,000 people) of the population. The percentage is significantly higher in the Berlin neighborhoods of Neukölln, Kreuzberg and Gesundbrunnen. Other significant centres of Arab populations in Germany can be found in the Rhine-Ruhr metropolitan region, Frankfurt, Munich, Hanover and Hamburg. Most Arabs reside in urban areas and cities in former West-Germany. The only place in former Eastern Germany with a sizeable number of Arabs is Leipzig, where people of any Arab descent make up 0.8% of the total population (4,000 out of 522,800). Among the German districts with the highest shares of Arab migrants in 2011 were especially cities in the Frankfurt Rhine-Main Metropolitan Region (Frankfurt, Offenbach) and the Rhineland (Bonn, Düsseldorf) with large groups of Moroccan migrants.

Families involved in crime 

Clans of Middle Eastern descent have organised parallel societies in Berlin and Bremen where they sustain themselves by crime. In Berlin, 20 extended families with each having up to 500 members are established according to estimates of the police, but not all family members are involved in crime. According to the Landeskriminalamt, a third of all court proceedings against organized crime concerns members of the clans. About half of the clan suspects had a German passport.

In January 2019, 1300 police took part in an effort against Arab crime families in Essen, Duisburg, Bochum, Dortmund, Recklinghausen and Gelsenkirchen. It was the largest police operation in the history of North Rhine-Westphalia.

Notable Germans of Arab descent
Hamed Abdel-Samad, political scientist and author of Egyptian origin
Khalid al-Maaly, Arab writer and publisher of Iraqi origin
Tarek Al-Wazir, politician of Yemeni origin
Hans Hauck, son of Algerian soldier 
Lamya Kaddor, scholar of Islamic studies and writer of Syrian origin
Adel Karasholi, writer of Syrian origin
Souad Mekhennet journalist and author of Moroccan origin
Najem Wali journalist and novelist of Iraqi origin

Film, television, acting
Lexi Alexander, film director of Palestinian origin
Elyas M'Barek, actor of Tunisian/Austrian origins
Hisham Zreiq, filmmaker and visual artist of Palestinian origin

Music
Laith Al-Deen, pop musician of Iraqi origin
Farid Bang rapper of Moroccan origin
Bushido, rapper of Tunisian origin
Tony D, rapper of Lebanese origin
Samy Deluxe, rapper and hip hop artist of Sudanese origin
Loco Dice, DJ and electronic music producer of Tunisian origin
Senna Gammour, pop singer and songwriter of Algerian-Moroccan origin
Fady Maalouf, singer of Lebanese origin
Massiv rapper of Palestinian origin
Baba Saad, rapper of Lebanese origin
Tarééc, singer of Lebanese-Palestinian origin
Adel Tawil, singer of Egyptian-Tunisian origin
U-cee, soul singer of Egyptian-Tunisian origin
Safy Boutella, musician of Algerian origin 

Sports
 Carlo Boukhalfa, footballer of Algerian origin
Jérome Polenz, footballer of Algerian origin 
Mustapha Amari, football player of Algerian origin
Mohamed Amsif, footballer of Moroccan origin
Nassim Banouas, footballer of Algerian origin 
Mohammad Baghdadi, football player of Lebanese origin
 Karim Bellarabi, footballer of Moroccan origin
Karim Benyamina, football player of Algerian origin
Soufian Benyamina, football player of Algerian origin
Sofian Chahed, footballer of Tunisian origin
Mounir Chaftar, footballer of Tunisian origin 
Adil Chihi, footballer of Moroccan origin
Daniel Brückner, German-Algerian footballer 
Rola El-Halabi, boxer of Lebanese origin
Rachid El Hammouchi footballer of Moroccan origin
Rafed El-Masri, swimmer of Syrian origin
 Rani Khedira
Sami Khedira, football player of Tunisian origin
Malik Fathi, footballer of Sudannese origin
Murat Salar, football player of Egyptian-Turkish origin
Mahmoud Charr, WBA heavyweight champion boxer of Lebanese/Syrian origin
 Yassin Ibrahim, football player of Sudanese origin

See also
Arabs in Berlin
Arabs in Europe
Arab diaspora

References

 
Middle Eastern diaspora in Germany
Muslim communities in Europe